HK Sabinov is an ice hockey team in Sabinov, Slovakia. They play in the Slovak 2. Liga, the third level of ice hockey in Slovakia. The club was founded in 1948.

History
The Hockey Club was founded in Sabinov in 1948. His president was Eduard Ondáš and the secretary was Ján Seman. The first hockey game was played on a new ice rink with the team TJ Bardejov. Sabinov won this match 9–2.

Club names
 ŠK Slávia Sabinov
 TJ Sokol Sabinov
 TJ Slavoj Sabinov
 TJ Družstevník Sabinov
 TJ Slovan Sabinov
 VTJ MHK Sabinov
 MHK Sabinov
 HK Sabinov

References

External links
 

Sabinov
1948 establishments in Slovakia
Ice hockey clubs established in 1948